Mateusz Broź (born 12 July 1988 in Giżycko) is a Polish footballer (midfielder) who currently plays for Warta Poznań.

Career

Club
In summer 2010 he joined Kolejarz Stróże.

In July 2011, he signed a contract with Flota Świnoujście.

References

External links
 

1988 births
Living people
Polish footballers
Wisła Kraków players
Widzew Łódź players
Sandecja Nowy Sącz players
Kolejarz Stróże players
Flota Świnoujście players
Garbarnia Kraków players
Motor Lublin players
People from Giżycko
Sportspeople from Warmian-Masurian Voivodeship
Association football midfielders